Extremoplusia megaloba is a moth of the family Noctuidae. It is found in the North-eastern parts of the Himalaya over the Peninsular Malaysia and through  Taiwan to Borneo.

External links
Extremoplusia at funet
Photo of Adult

Plusiinae